Tom Finn is an Irish cyclist. He won the Rás Tailteann in 1961.

Career
Finn won the 1959 Tour of Ulster and the 1961 Rás Tailteann.

Personal and later life
Finn and his company Affidea Ireland sponsor the Waterford Garda Charity Cycle.

References

External links

Irish male cyclists
Rás Tailteann winners
Year of birth missing (living people)
Living people
Place of birth missing (living people)